Erroneous may refer to:
 Erroneous program, a program whose semantics are not well-defined, but where the language implementation is not obligated to signal an error.
 "Erroneous rendition", a euphemism used by the U.S. Central Intelligence Agency (CIA) for the forcible abduction and transfer to the U.S. of a target in another legal jurisdiction
 Erroneous, a pseudonym used by bassist Alex Dmochowski, so credited on the Frank Zappa albums Waka/Jawaka, The Grand Wazoo and Apostrophe (')

See also
 Error